USS Tornado (PC-14) is the fourteenth and last s, notable for being the only ship in the class designed with shaping features for signature management. She was laid down by Bollinger Shipyards, Lockport, Louisiana 25 August 1998 and launched 7 June 1999. She was commissioned by the United States Navy 24 June 2000, decommissioned 1 October 2004 and transferred to the United States Coast Guard as USCGC Tornado (WPC-14).

Background

The primary mission of Cyclone class was to serve as a platform for maritime special operations, including interdiction, escort, non-combatant evacuation, reconnaissance, operational deception, intelligence collection, and tactical swimmer operations. Her small size, stealthy construction, and high speed were tailored to performing long-range Special Operations Forces (SOF) insertion and extraction and other SOF support duties, in particular U.S. Navy Seals.

The ship's operational capabilities were designed to meet the unique requirements of special warfare missions. In high-speed, hard-over turns, the ship barely heeled as the automatic stabilizers engaged.

In the mid-1990s when the Special Operations Command rejected them as too big for special operations missions, and the regular surface Navy dismissed them as too small for any of its missions. The Navy began looking for ways to phase out Tornado and her sister ships.

Operational history

She was commissioned by the United States Navy 24 June 2000, decommissioned 1 October 2004 and transferred to the United States Coast Guard as USCGC Tornado (WPC-14).

Tornado was transferred back to the Navy on 30 September 2011, and was once again designated PC-14.

As of January 2018, USS Tornado was the only Cyclone-class patrol ship that still uses the MK38 25 mm Mod 1 Gun System. She was also the only known ship left in the U.S. Navy with Mod 1 Gun System. She is also the only ship in the class with signature management features. USS Tornado also held the distinction, other than USS Constitution, of being the last active U.S. Navy warship with all crew served weapons. In October 2018, Tornado was a participant in the 2018 Baltimore Fleet Week.

On 1 March 2019 Tornado deployed for patrol in the 4th Fleet area of responsibility, her first deployment in over 5 years. In May 2019, Tornado participated in Fleet Week being docked at the United States Merchant Marine Academy.

Tornado was decommissioned on 18 February 2021 and is currently awaiting sale to a foreign military partner at the Inactive Ship Maintenance Facility in Philadelphia.

References

External links
Federation of American Scientists, Cyclone class ship characteristics
Navsource.org ship history

Cyclone-class patrol ships
Ships of the United States Coast Guard
Ships built in Lockport, Louisiana
1999 ships